Serfontein is a surname. Notable people with the surname include:

Boela Serfontein (born 1988), South African rugby union player
Divan Serfontein (born 1954), South African rugby union player
Jan Serfontein (born 1993), South African rugby union rugby player
Nico Serfontein (born 1968), South African rugby football coach and former player